Bek Baghi (also Romanized as Bek Bāghī; also known as Beg Bāghī, Beg Bāghi, Beg-Vagi, and Beyg Bāghī) is a village in Ilat-e Qaqazan-e Gharbi Rural District, Kuhin District, Qazvin County, Qazvin Province, Iran. At the 2006 census, its population was 48, in 15 families.

References 

Populated places in Qazvin County